Arturo Labriola (21 January 1873 – 23 June 1959) was an Italian revolutionary syndicalist and socialist politician and journalist.

Biography

Early political activity (until 1897)
Labriola was born in Naples on 21 January 1873 to Luigi Labriola, an artisan. While studying jurisprudence in University of Naples, Arturo Labriola started his political activity. In 1891 he joined the Republican-Socialist University Circle. Between 1892–1895, he collaborated on various periodicals: Socialismo Popolare, edited by Carlo Monicelli, Rivista Popolare di Politica, Litteratura e Scienze Sociali, edited by Napoleone Colajanni and Critica Sociale, edited by Filippo Turati. In 1894–1895, Labriola was involved with the Fasci Siciliani  and therefore was suspended for one year from university studies. In 1897, Labriola joined Italian Socialist Party (PSI) and fought in the Greco-Turkish War in Crete.

Life in exile (1898–1900)
In May 1898, workers in Milan organized strikes and protests to demonstrate against the government. The riots were brutally repressed: troops fired on demonstrators, and Filippo Turati was arrested, accused of inspiring the riots. Labriola fled to Geneva in order to elude arrest. There, he taught at University of Geneva and worked with Vilfredo Pareto. Labriola was expelled from Switzerland in the same year and moved to Paris. In Paris he met the socialists Georges Sorel, Hubert Lagardelle and Paul Lafargue.

Revolutionary syndicalist period
He returned to Italy in 1900, and in 1902 published a weekly called Avanguardia Socialista which became the center of activity for Italian revolutionary syndicalism. From 1910 to 1911 he was one of the leading contributors of La Lupa, a weekly magazine supporting the revolution. He later withdrew his support for revolution, and adopted Marxist Reformism, becoming a member of the Italian Parliament as an independent. Favourable to Italy's participation in World War I, Labriola also served as Minister of Labor in the last of Giovanni Giolitti's cabinets (1920).

An opponent of Fascism, he had to take exile in France after Benito Mussolini came to power, but returned in 1935. In 1946 he was elected member of the Constituent Assembly of Italy as a National Democratic Union candidate. In 1948 he became a senator of the new Republic.

As it was confirmed by the former President of the Grand Orient of Italy, he was one of the eight father constituents belonging to the main Italian Masonic organization.

Works
La teoria del valore di C. Marx, Studio sul III libro del Capitale (1899)
Riforme e rivoluzione sociale (1904, 1906)
Karl Marx, L'Économiste, Le Socialiste (1910)
Storia di dieci anni (1910)
La guerra di Tripoli e l'opinione socialista (1912)
Spiegazioni a me stesso (1945)

References 

1873 births
1959 deaths
19th-century Neapolitan people
Italian Socialist Party politicians
Italian Ministers of Labour
Deputies of Legislature XXIV of the Kingdom of Italy
Deputies of Legislature XXV of the Kingdom of Italy
Deputies of Legislature XXVI of the Kingdom of Italy
Deputies of Legislature XXVII of the Kingdom of Italy
Members of the Constituent Assembly of Italy
Senators of Legislature I of Italy
Politicians of Campania
Italian syndicalists
20th-century Italian journalists
Italian male journalists
Italian anti-fascists
Italian Aventinian secessionists